Blagoveshchenka is the name of several inhabited localities in Russia:
Blagoveshchenka, Altai Krai, an urban locality (a work settlement) in Blagoveshchensky District of Altai Krai
Blagoveshchenka, name of several rural localities